The Battle of Huesca was fought during the First Carlist War on May 24, 1837, between Spanish Constitutionalists and Carlists.  During the course of the battle, the French Foreign Legion, which had been attached to the Cristinist army, suffered heavy casualties resulting in its strength being halved. The result of the battle was a decisive Carlist victory.

References

 

Huesca
Huesca
Huesca
Huesca
Huesca
1837 in Spain
May 1837 events